Chandanapally is a village in the Kodumon subdivision in Pathanamthitta district of Kerala, India. The town is home to the annual Chandanappally Valiyapally Festival, which culminates in a Chembeduppu ceremony. The ceremony attracts a lot of pilgrims.

Health centre
The hospital is Primary Health Center Chandanapally. There are three doctors available and 24 beds.

References

See also
 St. George Orthodox Church, Chandanappally
 Pathanamthitta

Villages in Pathanamthitta district